Jim Jam and Sunny is a British children's television programme that aired on the CITV channel. It was first aired on November 20, 2006 and ended in 2008.

Premise 
Jim Jam is 3, and his older sister Sunny is 5. Whenever they enter their magical room, the toys come to life, and they have many adventures together.

Characters

Main characters 
 Jim Jam: A 3-year-old boy. He has orange skin, blue hair and wears clothes with a moon motif. He is fascinated by everyday objects; he shares a strong bond with Nobby, and enjoys exploring and having fun. 
 Sunny: Jim Jam's older sister, who is 5 years old. Has violet hair and yellow skin and wears clothes decorated with a sun motif. She is very protective of her little brother, Jim Jam; her favourite toy is Gigi, and enjoys painting and reading.

The toys 
 Nobby: He is the clown of the group, Always looking for fun, Loves to dance and sing full of energy.
 Mouth: The smallest of the group, But definitely the loudest, And teaches his friends the value of laughter.
 Gigi: The eldest of the toys, Graceful and considerate, A very reliable friend to all. 
 Bot: a robot with a built-in computer, Keen to teach his friends new facts, Sometimes has silly ideas.
 Slim: He is always bumping into things, A very loveable toy, And a great big scaredy cat.

References

External links 
 

2000s British children's television series
2006 British television series debuts
2008 British television series endings
British television shows featuring puppetry
Television series about children
Television series by Universal Television
English-language television shows